Dawn's New Ragtime Follies is a 1973 album by the American pop group Tony Orlando and Dawn. This release was a concept album that combined Vaudevillian ragtime flavors with pop and disco music. With multi-generational appeal, and aided by Tony Orlando & Dawn's highly successful weekly TV variety show on CBS,  Dawn's New Ragtime Follies sold millions and became Tony Orlando & Dawn’s best selling LP. New Ragtime Follies spawned the best-selling singles "Say, Has Anybody Seen My Sweet Gypsy Rose," "Who’s in the Strawberry Patch With Sally" and "Steppin' Out (Gonna Boogie Tonight)." Telma Hopkins is featured on lead vocals for a cover of John Sebastian's "Daydream", which was a hit for the Lovin' Spoonful in 1966. A recent compact disc reissue of the album contains four bonus tracks, "Jolie", "Personality", Come Back Billie Jo", and a slightly varied single version of "Steppin’ Out."

Track listing
"Overture" 3:08
"Steppin' Out (Gonna Boogie Tonight)" (Irwin Levine, L. Russell Brown) 2:54
"Say, Has Anybody Seen My Sweet Gypsy Rose" (Levine, Brown) 2:51
"If It Wasn't for You Dear" (Levine, Brown) 3:40
"Sweet Summer Days of My Life" (Dave Appell, Sandy Linzer) 3:09
"Who's in the Strawberry Patch with Sally?" (Levine, Brown) 2:23
"Daydream" (John Sebastian) 3:02
"Atlanta" (Eddie Rabin) 2:59
"Ukulele Man" (Appell, Linzer, Hank Medress) 3:05
"You Say the Sweetest Things" (Appell, Linzer) 3:30
"Reprise (Strawberry Patch)" (1:09)

Personnel
Tony Orlando – lead vocals 
Telma Hopkins, Joyce Vincent - backing vocals 
Al Schwartzberg - drums
Julie Medress, Mike Mainieri - percussion, vibraphone 
Stu Woods - bass
Frank Owens, Jon Stroll, Joel Mofsenson, Warren Bernhardt - keyboards
Bob Mann, Dave Appell, Jerry Friedman - guitars, ukulele

Charts

Production
Produced and mixed by Hank Medress and Dave Appell, with mixing engineered by Bob Radice
Recording by Bob Radice
Recorded at Century Sound Studio and Mediasound in New York City

Notes

Tony Orlando and Dawn albums
1973 albums
Bell Records albums